The Williams-Moore-Hillsman House, in Crawford County, Georgia near Roberta, Georgia, was built in 1827.  It was listed on the National Register of Historic Places in 2001.

The main house, also known as the John Williams House, is a two-story house with a two-story pedimented portico.

The second building is a small house believed to be a slave dwelling.

It is located on West Hopewell Rd. at Colbert Rd.

References

National Register of Historic Places in Crawford County, Georgia
Georgian architecture in Georgia (U.S. state)
Buildings and structures completed in 1827